Lake Jucumarini, Lake Jacumarini or Lake Ucumarini (possibly from Aymara jukumari bear) is a lake in Peru at 4390 m of elevation. It is located in the Moquegua Region, General Sánchez Cerro Province, Ichuña District.

See also
 Pharaquta
List of lakes in Peru

References

Lakes of Moquegua Region
Lakes of Peru